Associazione Sportiva Roma failed to defend their 2001 Serie A title, and had to settle for second best, whilst being beaten by Juventus. Its main target for the season was to win the UEFA Champions League, which it failed when it got knocked out in the second group stage, rendering better form in the league when it did not have to rest players in those matches anymore. The season highlight was a crushing 5–1 win over city rivals Lazio.

Players

Squad information

Transfers

Winter

Competitions

Overall

Last updated: 5 May 2002

Supercoppa Italiana

Serie A

League table

Results summary

Results by round

Matches

Coppa Italia

Round of 16

Quarter-finals

UEFA Champions League

Group stage

Second group stage

Statistics

Players statistics

Goalscorers

Last updated: 5 May 2002

Clean sheets

Last updated: 5 May 2002

Disciplinary record

Last updated:

References

A.S. Roma seasons
Roma